My Forbidden Past is a 1951 American historical film noir directed by Robert Stevenson and starring Robert Mitchum and Ava Gardner. Adapted by Leopold Atlas from Polan Banks' novel Carriage Entrance.

Plot
In the 1890s in New Orleans, Dr. Mark Lucas (Robert Mitchum) wrongly believes Barbara Beaurevel (Ava Gardner) refused him and betrayed him after their previously planned elopement. Thus Mark returns from South America accompanied by Corinne (Janis Carter), a woman he married for her beauty but not for love, due to this still lingering grudge against Barbara. She feels disappointed on meeting Corinne, yet she's determined to win him back. Barbara, already having inherited a large sum from her socially of ill repute grandmother, bribes her cousin Paul (Melvyn Douglas) into seducing Corinne and thereby breaking up the marriage. Unluckily this cold-blooded plan ends up in Corinne's death by accident and Mark finds himself under strong suspicion of murder. In the end, Barbara, realizing her insidious act at the trial, empathetically confesses everything, thereby once again becoming a woman worthy of love but also losing the local gentry's consideration.

Cast

 Robert Mitchum as Dr. Mark Lucas

 Ava Gardner as Barbara Beaurevel

 Melvyn Douglas as Paul Beaurevel

 Lucile Watson as Aunt Eula Beaurevel

 Janis Carter as Corinne Lucas 
 Gordon Oliver as Clay Duchesne
 Basil Ruysdael as Dean Cazzley
 Clarence Muse as Pompey
 Walter Kingsford as Coroner
 Will Wright as Luther Toplady

Production
The film was to star Ann Sheridan. Under her contract she had co star approval. RKO claimed she refused all the names offered her and thus terminated the contract, replacing her with Ava Gardner. Sheridan sued RKO for $350,000. The case went to trial and in February 1951 the jury awarded her $55,162, being the minimum amount Sheridan would have earned during filming from April to August 1949 plus $5,162 for costs. It was shown that Sheridan would have approved Mitchum as a co star.

Reception
The film recorded a loss of $700,000.

References

External links

 
 
 
 

1951 films
American historical romance films
American romantic drama films
American black-and-white films
Films directed by Robert Stevenson
Films scored by Friedrich Hollaender
Films set in New Orleans
1950s historical romance films
Films set in the 1890s
RKO Pictures films
1950s English-language films
1950s American films